Actias selene, the Indian moon moth or Indian luna moth, is a species of saturniid moth from Asia. It was first described by Jacob Hübner in 1807. This species is popular among amateur entomologists and is often reared from eggs or cocoons that are available from commercial sources. They fly mainly at night.

Distribution
This moth is quite widespread, found from India to Japan and then south into Nepal, Sri Lanka, Borneo, and other islands in eastern Asia. Many subspecies live in Pakistan, Afghanistan, the Philippines, Russia, China, Java, Sri Lanka, Sumatra and Borneo.

Subspecies
Actias selene selene (Hübner, 1807)
Actias selene brevijuxta (Nässig & Treadaway, 1997)
Actias selene eberti Rougeot, 1969 (Afghanistan)
Actias selene taprobanis U. Paukstadt & L.H. Paukstadt, 1999 (Sri Lanka)

Hybrid
Graellsia isabellae × Actias selene is a hybrid of the Spanish moon moth (Graellsia isabellae) and the Indian moon moth.

Adult

Male: Head, thorax, and abdomen white; palpi pink, prothorax with a dark pink band; legs pink. Forewing very pale green, white at base; a dark pink costal fascia, darkest along subcostal vein: an outwardly-oblique pale yellow antemedial line; two inwardly-oblique slightly curved submarginal lines; a pale yellow marginal band; a dark red-brown lunule at end of cell, with a grey line on it, bounding inwardly a round ochreous spot with pinkish centre. Hindwing similar to the forewing; the central portion of the tail pinkish.

Female: The outer margin less excised and waved; the yellow markings less developed; the antemedial line of forewing nearer the base, and that on hindwing absent; the tail less pink.

Life cycle
Eggs are 2 mm, coloured white with extensive black and brown mottling. Incubation lasts approximately 12 days and newly hatched larvae are red with a black abdominal saddle. Second-instar larvae are all red with black heads. It is not until the third instar that larvae take on a green colour. The developing larvae prefer humid conditions.

Larva
Larva apple green; paired dorsal and lateral yellow spinous tubercles on each somite except the last; dorsal yellow hairs; lateral and ventral black hairs; the pad to anal claspers rufous.

Pupa
Cocoon pale brown and oval.

Images of life cycle

Host plants
Liquidambar (sweetgum)
Rhododendron
Prunus (including cherry)
Malus (including apple)
Coriaria
Pieris (andromeda)
Hibiscus
Salix (willow)
Crataegus (hawthorn)
Photinia (red robin)
Juglans regia (walnut)
Musa (banana)

References

External links

 http://www.butterflies.be

Videos 
Fourth instar eating
Fifth instar eating Part 2 Part 3
Moth emerging from pupa Part 2 Part 3

Selene
Moths described in 1807
Moths of Asia